Croydon South is a constituency created in 1974 and represented in the House of Commons of the UK Parliament since 2015 by Chris Philp, a Conservative.

Political history
In 1974, the original Croydon South constituency created in 1918 was renamed Croydon Central and the current Croydon South was created from the northwestern part of East Surrey, covering Purley and Coulsdon, which had become parts of Greater London in 1965.

Since its creation, the constituency has been represented by three Conservative MPs. Sir William Clark, who had represented East Surrey since 1970, won the new seat in February 1974, and held it until his retirement in 1992. His successor, Sir Richard Ottaway, then held the seat until 2015, when he stood down and was succeeded by Chris Philp. Boundary changes have been minor and the 2015 result made the seat the 145th safest of the Conservative Party's 331 seats by percentage of majority. At the 2015 general election, it was one of the Conservatives' safest seats in Greater London.

Constituency profile
Croydon South consists of affluent suburbia, including a significant minority of large houses with gardens on the North Downs escarpment. It has many well-to-do commuters taking advantage of the fast trains to the City and Gatwick Airport, plus a significant proportion of retired people.

The village-like Selsdon – one of the few places in the seat where transport links are poor – has a place on the political map having spawned the phrase 'Selsdon Man', its swing and voters first seen as an ideal bellwether for the national swing by the Conservative Party. The Purley Way, which runs mainly through Waddon, has become home to large retail estates for out-of-town shopping and leisure. Waddon is the sole Labour ward in the constituency – one of its councillors, Andrew Pelling, the former Conservative MP for Croydon Central, defected to the Labour Party.

At the southern end of the constituency, Coulsdon has much in common with the residual county of Surrey of which it was a more intrinsically associated part until 1965 as it was excluded from Croydon County Borough on the county borough's creation in 1889.

Boundaries

Members of Parliament

Election results

Elections in the 2010s

Elections in the 2000s

Elections in the 1990s

Elections in the 1980s

Elections in the 1970s

See also
List of parliamentary constituencies in London

Notes

References

Sources

External links 
Politics Resources (Election results from 1922 onwards)
Electoral Calculus (Election results from 1955 onwards)

Parliamentary constituencies in London
Politics of the London Borough of Croydon
Constituencies of the Parliament of the United Kingdom established in 1974